Zakrzewo Wielkie may refer to the following places:
Zakrzewo Wielkie, Ciechanów County in Masovian Voivodeship (east-central Poland)
Zakrzewo Wielkie, Mława County in Masovian Voivodeship (east-central Poland)
Zakrzewo Wielkie, Ostrów Mazowiecka County in Masovian Voivodeship (east-central Poland)